The Baptist Health 200 is an annual 200-mile (321.869 km) NASCAR Camping World Truck Series race held at the Homestead–Miami Speedway in Homestead, Florida. The race began as a 250-mile race in 1996, but beginning with the 2002 season, the race was shortened by 50 miles.

History
Beginning as a 250-mile race, the inaugural race in 1996 was won by Ford racing driver Dave Rezendes after starting the race tenth on the grid. The following year, John Nemechek was seriously injured in a crash during the race and died several days later, becoming the first of two drivers (the other being Tony Roper in 2000) to die from injuries sustained in a crash in the Truck Series.

Kenny Irwin Jr. and Rick Crawford won the second and third running of the race, while Mike Wallace won the event in 1999 after going an extra seven miles. In 2000, Chevrolet racing driver, Andy Houston won the event after qualifying third on the grid; the highest starting position for any of the winners at the time. Ted Musgrave won the final 250-mile race ahead of Travis Kvapil in 2001.

For the 2002 running of the race, the race's distance was shortened by 50 miles and was moved to November, becoming the last race in the championship season. Ron Hornaday Jr. recorded the win ahead of the defending winner Musgrave. The next five runnings of the race were won by Bobby Hamilton, Kasey Kahne, Todd Bodine, Mark Martin and Johnny Benson Jr. In 2008, Bodine became the first driver to win the event more than once. Kevin Harvick, Kyle Busch and Johnny Sauter won the next three editions of the event in 2009, 2010 and 2011.

In 2020, the race was moved from the season finale to the third round of the schedule. Although initially scheduled for Friday, March 20, the race was postponed to Saturday, June 13 due to the COVID-19 pandemic. Baptist Health assumed naming rights for the event.

The 2021 race was replaced by the Sunoco 159 at the Daytona International Speedway road course, a move that followed the Cup and Xfinity Series changing from Auto Club Speedway to Daytona because of COVID-19. However, the two higher series retained their Homestead races for the 2021 season.

Past winners

Notes

1999, 2007–2009, and 2012–2013: Race was extended due to a NASCAR overtime finish.
2005: Race postponed from Friday night to Saturday morning due to rain.
2006: First Truck race at night.
2011: Race shortened due to rain.
2018: Won both the race and championship.
 2020: Race postponed from March 20 to June 13 due to the COVID-19 pandemic.
2021: Race canceled and moved to the Daytona road course due to the COVID-19 pandemic.

Multiple winners (drivers)

Multiple winners (teams)

Manufacturer wins

See also
Contender Boats 250
Dixie Vodka 400

References

External links
 

1996 establishments in Florida
 
NASCAR Truck Series races
Recurring sporting events established in 1996
Ford Motor Company
Annual sporting events in the United States